Erik Udam (10 July 1938 – 6 February 1990) was an Estonian independence activist and wrestler.

In 1979 he was one of the signatories of Baltic Appeal. In 1987 he was one of the main figure for MRP-AEG.

He has won Estonian Championships in Greco-Roman wrestling.

References

1938 births
1990 deaths
Estonian independence activists
Estonian wrestlers